Die Anrheiner is a German television soap opera series, broadcast on WDR-TV since March 21, 1998. The series is set and filmed in Cologne.

See also
Ein Fall für die Anrheiner (2011 – 2014)
List of German television series

References

External links
 

German television soap operas
1998 German television series debuts
2011 German television series endings
2000s German television series
Television shows set in Cologne
German-language television shows
Das Erste original programming